John Gibson (flourished in London 1750 to his death in 1792) was an English cartographer, geographer, draughtsman and engraver.

Recognized as an important late eighteenth-century British cartographer, a contemporary of Jacques-Nicolas Bellin and skilled engraver, spent most of his life in prison because of several debts, however, produced thousands of maps and its best-known work in 1758 was called the pocket atlas Atlas Minimus. He worked also for the Gentleman's Magazine for which engraved different decorative maps. He also published his own work in The Universal Magazine of Knowledge and Pleasure, The Universal Museum and The Universal Traveller.

References

External links

University of Pittsburgh, Atlas Minimus

1750 births
1792 deaths
English cartographers
Publishers (people) from London
18th-century English people
18th-century engravers